La'Shard Suava Anderson (born 27 April 1989) is an American basketball player. He played college basketball for the Boise State Broncos.

Career
Andreson signed with Optima Gent in August 2011. He averaged 4.9 points in 15 minutes per game in 25 games for Gent.

On 25 January 2013 he signed with the Tunisian club Club Africain.

In July 2013, Anderson signed with Rotterdam Basketbal College from the Dutch Basketball League (DBL). On December 11, he scored 47 points in a double overtime win over Aris Leeuwarden, the league's highest point tally by a player since Robby Bostain in 2009.

On 28 January 2015 he signed with ece Bulls Kapfenberg in Austria.

On 2 January 2016 Anderson signed with his former team Challenge Sports Rotterdam.

On 9 March 2017, Anderson transferred to AEK Larnaca. In the 2017–18 season, Anderson played for the Near East University's basketball team in the third division Cypriotic North League.

On 17 August 2018, Anderson returned to Feyenoord Basketbal, previously named Rotterdam, as he signed for the 2018–19 season. On 16 October, Feyenoord released Anderson. Anderson appeared in three DBL games and averaged 12.7 points per game.

References

External links
DraftExpress profile

1989 births
Living people
AEK Larnaca B.C. players
American expatriate basketball people in Austria
American expatriate basketball people in Belgium
American expatriate basketball people in Cyprus
American expatriate basketball people in the Netherlands
American men's basketball players
Basketball players from San Diego
Boise State Broncos men's basketball players
Club Africain basketball players
Dutch Basketball League players
Feyenoord Basketball players
Gent Hawks players
Junior college men's basketball players in the United States
Kapfenberg Bulls players
Point guards
Shooting guards